Cowan Lake is a lake in the Canadian province of Saskatchewan in the Beaver River watershed. The primary inflow for the lake is Big River at the lake's southern end by the town of Big River and the outflow, located near the lake's northern end, is Cowan River at Cowan Lake Dam. The dam was originally built in 1937 and was upgraded in 1971.

Highway 55 follows the length of the lake along its eastern shore and Highway 942 runs up most of the length of the western shore.

Cowan Lake was named after Leo Martin Cowan who served in the Royal Canadian Air Force and died on 29 August 29, 1942.

Parks and recreation 
At the southern end of Cowan Lake at the town of Big River is Big River Regional Park. The park has a campground and boat launch on the lake's shore. At the northern end of the lake is Cowan Dam Recreation Site. It is a small campground at the dam that is accessed from Highway 55.

Fish species 
Commonly found fish in the lake include northern pike, yellow perch, and walleye.

See also 
List of lakes of Saskatchewan
List of protected areas of Saskatchewan
Saskatchewan Water Security Agency
Dams and reservoirs in Saskatchewan

References 

Lakes of Saskatchewan